Alice in Wonderland is a 2007 operatic adaptation of the novels Alice's Adventures in Wonderland (1865) and Through the Looking-Glass (1871) by Lewis Carroll. It is the first opera of Korean composer Unsuk Chin, who co-wrote the English libretto with the Asian-American playwright David Henry Hwang.

It had its world premiere on 30 June 2007. However, the jacket and notice of the DVD of the world premiere indicates that the recording was made on 27 June at the Bavarian State Opera as part of the 2007 Munich Opera Festival. Conducted by Kent Nagano and featuring Sally Matthews in the title role and Dame Gwyneth Jones as the Queen of Hearts, the production was hailed as World Premiere of the Year by the German opera magazine Opernwelt. A DVD was subsequently released by Euroarts.

Roles

Scenes
Scene I – Dream I
Scene II – The Pool of Tears
Scene III – In the House of the White Rabbit
Interlude I – Advice from a Caterpillar
Scene IV – Pig and Pepper
Scene V – A Mad Tea Party
Scene VI – The Croquet Ground
Interlude II
Scene VII – The Trial or Who Stole the Tarts?
Finale – Dream II

References

External links
 Looking-glass Opera, by Alex Ross, The New Yorker
 Alice in Wonderland, Bavarian State Opera

Operas
English-language operas
2007 operas
Music based on Alice in Wonderland
Operas by Unsuk Chin
Operas based on novels